The  was a class of minelayer submarine in the Imperial Japanese Navy (IJN), serving from the 1920s to World War II.

Design and construction
Their design was based on that of the Imperial German Navy minelaying submarine , a Type UE II submarine which was the largest of seven German submarines transferred to Japan as a war reparation after World War I and served in the Imperial Japanese Navy as O-6 from 1920 to 1921. Like UB-125, the Kiraisen-type submarines had two diesel engines producing a combined , could carry 42 mines, and had four torpedo tubes and a single deck gun — a  gun on the Japanese submarines in contrast to a  gun on UB-125.

The Imperial Japanese Navy ordered six I-121-class submarines, of which four were completed and two were cancelled. The Kawasaki Yard at Kobe, Japan, built all four of the submarines. In mid-1940, all four submarines underwent conversion into submarine tankers. Retaining their minelaying and torpedo capabilities, they were modified so that each of them could carry 15 tons of aviation gasoline with which to refuel flying boats, allowing the flying boats to extend their range during reconnaissance and bombing missions by meeting the submarines in harbors and lagoons for more fuel.

Service
All four submarines saw front-line service during the Second Sino-Japanese War, during which they operated in northern Chinese waters, and the first half of the war in the Pacific during World War II. In the latter conflict, they laid mines and conducted anti-shipping patrols in East Asia and off Australia in the war′s opening weeks, during which I-124 was sunk. The other three submarines supported Japanese operations during the Battle of Midway and the Guadalcanal campaign, in which I-123 was lost. After service on supply runs during the New Guinea campaign, the two survivors, by then considered obsolescent, were withdrawn from combat in September 1943 and relegated to training duties in home waters, during which I-122 was sunk in the last weeks of the war. I-121 surrendered at the end of the war and was scuttled the following year.

Boats in class

References

Footnotes

Bibliography
Boyd, Carl, and Akihiko Yoshida. The Japanese Submarine Force and World War II. Annapolis, Maryland: Naval Institute Press, 1995. .
, Gakken (Japan)
History of the Pacific War Vol. 17, I-Gō Submarines, January 1998, 
History of the Pacific War Extra, Perfect guide, The submarines of the Imperial Japanese Forces, March 2005, 
The Maru Special, Ushio Shobō (Japan)
Japanese Naval Vessels No. 43, Japanese Submarines III, September 1980
Japanese Naval Vessels No. 132, Japanese Submarines I (New edition), February 1988
Japanese Naval Vessels No. 133, Japanese Submarines II (New edition), March 1988

I-121
 
Submarines of the Imperial Japanese Navy
 
Mine warfare vessels of the Imperial Japanese Navy